The Girls Tour was the third concert tour by British singer Rita Ora, which served as a prelude to her, then upcoming, second studio album, Phoenix (2018). The promotional concert tour began on 11 May 2018 in Glasgow, Scotland.

Background 
On 30 October 2017, before the release of her second studio album, Ora announced tour dates, consisting of thirteen dates across the United Kingdom and Europe. Several other dates were added later on. Furthermore, Ora's festival appearances were also announced.

Tour dates

Notes

References 

Rita Ora concert tours
2018 concert tours